Hyalidae is a family of amphipods, containing 12 genera in two unequal subfamilies:

Hyalinae
Apohyale Bousfield & Hendrycks, 2002
Hyale Rathke, 1837
Insula Kunkel, 1910
Lelehua J. L. Barnard, 1970
Neobule Haswell, 1879
Parallorchestes Shoemaker, 1941
Parhyale Stebbing, 1897
Protohyale Bousfield & Hendrycks, 2002
Ptilohyale Bousfield & Hendrycks, 2002
Ruffohyale Bousfield & Hendrycks, 2002
Serejohyale Bousfield & Hendrycks, 2002
Hyachelinae
Hyachelia J. L. Barnard, 1967

References

Gammaridea
Crustacean families